The marquisate of Antella is a noble title given by the king Philip IV of Spain in Sicily to Nicolo Pallavicino Piamonte on September 22, 1649 due to his support to the Spanish Empire during the Thirty Years War preventing the rebellion of the Neapolitan Republic (1647) and Sicilian rebellion.

Nicolo Pallavicino was a very influent man in Palermo and Genoa as he was the banker of the duchy of Mantua, Vicente I Gonzaga de Mantua and Peter Paul Rubens, in his stay in Genoa, between many others.

Family 
Nicolo Pallaviccino was coming from the noble Pallavicini Family, before being honored with the "Marquees of Antella" or also known as the "Marquis of Antella" title, Nicolo was married with the marquise Maria Serra Pallavicino and after her death he married his second wife Maddalena Strozzi.

Marquesate 

The marquessate was name after the Italian city of Antella, located in the Tuscany, in the state of Bagno a Ripoli, located 4 miles from Florence.

Coat of Arms: Five blue and four silver squares with a golden top and three flat crosses dressed with a golden marquees crown.

Motto: "Fidelis Regi usque ad mortem"

Marquisate of Antella´s History 

 Nicolo Pallavicino, I Marquees of Antella (Sicily 1649), married with marquise Maria Serra Pallavicino. After Nicolo's death in 1650, her second wife Maddalena Strozzi became marquise of Antella.
 Maddalena Strozzi e di Termine, wife of Nicolo and II marquise of Antella, daughter of Orazio Strozzi marquees of Flowers, who after Nicolo's death married the Prince of Cassaro, passing the Marquis of Antella title to her second son Ottavio.
 Ottavio Gaetani-Strozzi, III Marquees of Antella, married with Violante Statella Pipi e Salonia
 Luigi Gaetani e Statella, son of Ottavio and Violante, who got the title in September 1680.
 (Maria) Gioacchina Gaeteni e Buglio, Princesses of Palagonia, IV Marquise of Antella. She if believed that was the inspiration of Villa Palagonia in Sicily, built by his husband Francesco Ferdinando, Princess of Palagonia.
 Francisco de Asís Sánchez y Ruiz-Constantino, V Marquees of Antella, rehabilitated the title on October 2, 1981. Supported the king Juan Carlos I of Spain in his succession.
 Juan Carlos Sánchez Peiro, VI Marquees of Antella. Obtained the title from Francisco after his death, the V marquees, after the Royal Letter to the King on March 2, 1998.
 Alvaro Sanchez Garcia de Viedma, VII Marquees of Antella. Obtained the title from Juan C. Sanchez after his death, the VI marquees, after the Royal Letter to the King on Dec 26th, 2018.

Art and portraits 

Nicolo Pallavicino was portrayed by Peter Paul Rubens on 1604 in Genoa and two years later he also painted his new wife. Years later the marquise of Antella, Gioacchina Gaeteni e Buglio, was also painted and her portrait is at Villa Palagonia.

Nicolo Pallavicino was also family of the religious poet Hortensio Félix Paravicino portrait by El Greco in multiple paintings such as Fray Hortensio Félix Paravicino and the Burial of the Count of Orgaz.

Buildings named after the noble families Pallavicini, Strozzi and Gaetani 

 Palace Pallavicini in Vienna, Austria
 Palazzo Pallavicini-Rospigliosi in Rome
 Villa Durazzo-Pallavicini in Genoa, Italy
 Palacio Pallavicini in Bolognia, Italia
 Villa Gandolfi-Pallavicini en Bologna, Italy
 Palazzo Pallavicino in Parma, Italy
 Palacio Strozzi, Italy
 Palazzo Gaetani, Italy

References

Bibliography

External links 
 
 
 

1649 in Spain
History of Tuscany
Marquisates of Italy
Metropolitan City of Florence